The Legislature V of Italy was the 5th legislature of the Italian Republic, and lasted from 5 June 1968 until 24 May 1972. Its composition was the one resulting from the general election of 19 May 1968.

It was the first republican legislature to be dismissed before its term's natural expiration.

Main chronology
The period of the late 1960s–1970s came to be known as the Opposti Estremismi, (from left-wing and right-wing extremists riots), later renamed anni di piombo ("years of lead") because of a wave of political terrorist attacks.

After another short Leone's government, on 12 December 1968 Mariano Rumor sworn is as Prime Minister for the first time, leading a government composed by DC, PSU and PRI.

Between 1968 and 1970 a notable number of progressive reforms were carried out. On 11 December 1969 a new law extended access to higher education to all students holding a higher secondary school diploma. It was formerly limited to students who came from classical, and in some cases, scientific, curricula. Another bill, approved on 30 April 1969, introduced broad provisions covering pensions under the general scheme. The multiplying coefficient was increased to 1.85%, applied to average earnings of the best 3 years in the last 5 years of work (maximum pension, after 40 years of contribution: 74% of previous earnings). A social pension was also introduced for people over the age of 65 with low incomes and not eligible for any type of pension. In addition, cost of living indexation for all pensions (with the exception of social pensions) was introduced.

Rumor led three different governments. The second one, from August 1969 to February 1970, was a DC-only government; its collapse led to a 45-day long period without government. After this period, which included an attempt by former Prime Minister Amintore Fanfani to form a government, Rumor led a new coalition with PSI, PRI and PSDI from March until July 1970.

After another centre-left government led by Emilio Colombo, in February 1972 Giulio Andreotti was asked to form a new government which didn't obtained the confidence of the Parliament. On 28 February 1972 President Giovanni Leone dismissed the Parliament and called the first snap election in the history of the Italian Republic.

Presidential election
On 9 December 1971 the Parliament and the representatives of the 20 Italian regions met to elect the fifth President of Italy. On 24 December 1971 the Christian democrat Giovanni Leone was elected on the twenty-third ballot with 518 votes out of 1008.

Government

Parliamentary composition

Chamber of Deputies

 President: Sandro Pertini (PSI), elected on 5 June 1968
 Vice Presidents: Guido Gonella (DC, until 24 June 1968), Benigno Zaccagnini (DC), Lucio Mario Luzzatto (PSIUP), Arrigo Boldrini (PCI), Roberto Lucifredi (DC, from 24 July 1968)

Senate of the Republic

President: Amintore Fanfani (DC), elected on 5 June 1968 
 Vice Presidents: Giuseppe Spataro (DC), Domenico Macaggi (PSI, till 9 March 1969), Pietro Secchia (PCI), Pietro Caleffi (PSI, from 13 May 1970), Italo Viglianesi (PSI, from 26 March 1970)

Senators for Life

Gallery

References

Legislatures of Italy
1968 establishments in Italy
1972 disestablishments in Italy